Mike Wead (born Mickael Vikström on 6 April 1967) is a Swedish guitarist who lives in Stockholm. Wead contributed to heavy metal bands such as Hexenhaus, Memento Mori, Abstrakt Algebra, The Haunted, Edge of Sanity, Candlemass, The Project Hate. Currently Wead is the guitarist of Mercyful Fate, King Diamond, and bibleblack.

Discography

With Mercyful Fate

Dead Again (1998)
9 (1999)

With King Diamond

Abigail II: The Revenge (2002)
The Puppet Master (2003)
Deadly Lullabyes Live (2004)
Give Me Your Soul... Please (2007)
Songs for the Dead Live (2019)
The Institute (TBA)

With Hexenhaus

A Tribute to Insanity (1988)
At the Edge of Eternity (1990)
Awakening (1991)
Dejavoodoo (1997)

With Memento Mori

Rhymes of Lunacy (1993)
Life, Death, and Other Morbid Tales (1994)
La Danse Macabre (1996)
Songs for the Apocalypse Vol IV (1997)

With Abstrakt Algebra

Abstrakt Algebra (1995)

With Bibleblack

The Black Swan Epilogue (2009)

With Escape The Cult

All You Want To (2014)

Selected Guest Appearances

With Candlemass

Nightfall (1987)
As It Is, As It Was (1994)
Leif Edling The Black Heart of Candlemass  (2002)

With Memory Garden

Verdict of Prosterity (1998)

With Edge of Sanity

Crimson II (2003)

With Notre Dame

Demi Monde Bizarros (2004)

With In Aeternum

Dawn of the New Aeon (2005)

With Elvenking

The Scythe (2007)

With Her Whisper

The Great Unifier (2008)

With Sinners Paradise

The Awakening (2009)

With Kamlath

Stronger Than Frost (2010)

With The Project Hate MCMXCIX

The Lustrate Process (2009)
Bleeding The New Apocalypse (Cum Victriciis in Manibus Armis) (2011)

With Deadlands

Evilution (2012)

With Pharaoh

Bury the Light (2012)

With Snowy Shaw

Snowy Shaw is Alive! (2012)
Nachtgeist (2016)

With Minions

 Soul Mirror (2013)

With Entombed

 When in Sodom (2012)

With Zoromr

 Corpus Hermeticum (2015)

With Devilish Impressions

 The I (2017)

With Pigface Beauty

 Love & Hate (2017)

References

Living people
Lead guitarists
King Diamond (band) members
Mercyful Fate members
Swedish heavy metal guitarists
1967 births
Abstrakt Algebra members
Memento Mori (band) members